Darker-half is a heavy metal band from Sydney, led by vocalist Vo Simpson and known for their energetic live performances, their style has been described as power/thrash.

History 

Singer/guitarist Vo Simpson started Darker Half in 2003 while in high school. The band performed in halls and occasionally (illegally) in pubs. Darker Half's first foray into the wider Australian metal community was the band's performance at the first Metalstock festival in 2005.

Drummer Jim Bridgeman and bass player Max Griffiths left the band when they graduated from high school and were replaced by Benito Martino (drums) and Simon Hamilton (bass). An EP "Enough is Enough" was released at the second Metalstock festival in 2006. A song from the EP was included in the soundtrack of the feature film DarkLoveStory.

Darker Half played in various venues on the east coast of Australia throughout 2006 and 2007 and took part in all three outdoor Metalstock festivals. In 2008 Nick Alderton was replaced by Dom Simpson (Vo's brother) on guitar. In 2009 they released their first album Duality, produced by former Dimmu Borgir guitarist Astennu. One song from the album, "Take the Plunge", was included in the soundtrack of the feature film Acolytes starring Joel Edgerton.

In 2009 they toured nationally as support act for original Iron Maiden lead singer Paul Di'Anno. A music video for "Take the Plunge" was released. Martino left and was replaced on drums by Dom Simpson, who in turn was replaced on guitar by Brad Dickson. A national tour with Queensryche followed, along with a spot on the inaugural Screamfest international metal festival in Sydney.
In 2010 Darker Half again toured nationally with Paul Di'Anno, released a music video "Helpless" and performed at many shows throughout Australia.

Early in 2011 Darker Half recorded their second album Desensitized, which was released in Australia on Rockstar Records. Their "Desensitized tour" in August 2011 included all of the Australian state capitals and many major regional centres. They headlined the Whiplash Festival in Brisbane and opened for international acts Alestorm, Children of Bodom and Steve Grimmett.

In 2012, The Darker Half members were involved in projects aside from the band: Vo Simpson joined with various international singers including Udo Dirkschneider, Rob Rock and Steve Grimmett as one of the featured lead vocalists on the third Empires of Eden album Channelling the Infinite. He was also one of several guest lead vocalists on the Snake Sixx album It's all about the Riff. Through May and June 2012 Dom Simpson and Vo Simpson formed part of the backing band for former Judas Priest lead singer Tim 'Ripper' Owens for his Australian and New Zealand tour. Also in 2012, Darker Half released a music video of "End of the Line" from the Desensitized album.

In 2013 the band took part in a concert with Melbourne band Eyefear and veteran metal band Stratovarius.

In 2014, Darker Half release the band's third album, Never Surrender and undertook their first tour of the US.

In 2015 it was announced that Brad Dickson was leaving Darker Half. He was replaced by Jimmy Lardner-Brown, who had played with the Simpson brothers in the backing band for Tim "Ripper" Owens.

In February 2016 "Never Surrender" was released in Europe on the Fastball Music label and received much critical acclaim.

In June 2016 the EP "Classified" was released in Europe to coincide with Darker Half's first tour there.

Former Guitarist Brad Dickson died on 15 April 2020.

Discography 

"Rush" demo (2003)
Enough is Enough EP (2006)
Duality LP (2009)
Desensitized LP (2011)
Never Surrender. Album 2014
Classified EP (2016)
If You Only Knew LP (2020)

References 

Australian heavy metal musical groups